Óscar Horta Álvarez (born 7 May 1974) is a Spanish animal activist and moral philosopher who is currently a professor in the Department of Philosophy and Anthropology at the University of Santiago de Compostela (USC) and one of the co-founders of the organization Animal Ethics. He is known for his work in animal ethics, especially around the problem of wild animal suffering. He has also worked on the concept of speciesism and on the clarification of the arguments for the moral consideration of nonhuman animals. In 2022, Horta published his first book in English, Making a Stand for Animals.

Education and career

Horta completed an undergraduate degree in philosophy at the University of Santiago de Compostela (USC) in 1999, going on to complete a doctorate in philosophy at the same institution in 2007. His thesis was entitled Un desafío para la bioética: la cuestión del especismo ("A Challenge to Bioethics: The Issue of Speciesism"). In 2007, he won the Ferrater Mora Prize from the Oxford Centre for Animal Ethics, for his essay on the ethics of Catalan philosopher José Ferrater Mora.

From 2005 to 2009, he was a lecturer in the Department of Logic and Moral Philosophy at USC. He subsequently took up a visiting researcher position at Rutgers University from 2009 to 2010 and a research fellowship at the Spanish Foundation for Science and Technology from 2009 to 2011. He returned to USC in 2011 as a lecturer in the Department of Philosophy and Anthropology, becoming a professor in 2018.

Horta co-founded the animal advocacy organisation Animal Ethics in 2012. He has also acted as an organiser and spokesperson for the Spanish animal rights organisations Derechos para los Animales ("Rights for Animals") and Alternativa para la Liberación Animal ("Alternative for Animal Liberation"); these organisations later merged to form Equanimal. Horta is a member of the advisory board for the Sentience Institute, UPF-Centre for Animal Ethics, and Organisation for the Prevention of Intense Suffering.

Horta published Making a Stand for Animals, in 2022; his first English-language book.

Philosophical work

Speciesism 

Horta has defined speciesism as discrimination against those who do not belong to one or more species, understanding by discrimination an unjustified unequal consideration or treatment. This is a normative account of the concept. According to Horta, if treating animals of different species in different ways is justified then it cannot be considered discriminatory and it is not an instance of speciesism. Horta's account also denies that speciesism is confined to discrimination on the basis of species alone. Horta's account regards as speciesist all forms of discrimination against those who are not members of a certain species regardless of whether the reason is mere species membership or other reasons (such as the possession of complex cognitive abilities). He has argued in favor of this position by analogy to sexism or racism, which typically include discrimination against women or racialized people based on criteria such as their alleged capacities (not only gender, sex, ancestry, or physical traits). Horta's account of speciesism is also similar to Joan Dunayer's but unlike Paul Waldau's in that he has also argued that discrimination against nonhuman animals is only one instance of speciesism, which can be referred to as anthropocentric speciesism, because it is also possible to discriminate against some nonhuman animals in comparison to others in ways that are speciesist.

Wild animal suffering 

Horta argues that, contrary to an "idyllic" view of the wilderness, animals suffer significantly in nature from disease, predation, exposure, starvation, and other threats. Horta rejects speciesism, and thus argues that we have good reason to intervene in natural processes to protect animals from this suffering when it is possible to do so without causing more harm. Current ways of helping include rescues of animals during natural disasters, centres for orphaned, sick, and injured animals, and vaccination and feeding programs. Horta has claimed that such initiatives could be expanded, and that in order to avoid controversies with environmentalists opposing such initiatives, pilot programs could start by focusing on wild animals living in urban, suburban, or agricultural environments. He has also argued that the most promising courses of action right now may consist in gaining more knowledge about the conditions causing wild animal suffering and about how to best carry out measures that can improve the situation of animals affected by natural (or a combination of natural and indirectly anthropogenic) causes. Horta's work on wild animal suffering has been influential, with Jeff McMahan, whose work on wild animal suffering, "The Meat Eaters", appeared in The New York Times, attributing his interest in the question to Horta.

Personal life 
Horta is vegan and has commented that "the reason why I decided to go vegan was that I was presented with what I saw as strong arguments to do so, not that I was feeling empathy towards nonhuman animals."

Selected works

Horta has published philosophical work in Spanish, Galician, Portuguese, English, Italian, French, and German.

 
Horta, Oscar. Faria, Catia. 2019. "Welfare Biology", in Fischer, Bob (ed.) The Routledge Handbook of Animal Ethics, New York: Routledge, 
Horta, Oscar. 2019. Na defensa dos animais, Rianxo: Axóuxere Editora, .
Horta, Oscar. 2018. "Discrimination against vegans". Res Publica 24 (3): 359–73. .
Horta, Oscar. 2018. "Concern for wild animal suffering and environmental ethics: What are the limits of the disagreement?". Les ateliers de l'éthique 13 (1):85–100. 
Horta, Oscar. 2018. "Moral considerability and the argument from relevance". Journal of Agricultural and Environmental Ethics 31 (3): 369–88. .
Horta, Oscar. 2017. "Animal Suffering in Nature: The Case for Intervention". Environmental Ethics 39 (3): 261–279. .
Horta, Oscar. 2017. "Why the concept of moral status should be abandoned". Ethical Theory and Moral Practice 20 (4): 899–910. .
Horta, Oscar. 2017. Un paso adelante en defensa de los animales, Madrid: Plaza y Valdés, .
Horta, Oscar. 2017. "Population Dynamics Meets Animal Ethics", in Garmendia, Gabriel & Woodhall, Andrew (eds.) Ethical and Political Approaches to Nonhuman Animal Issues: Towards an Undivided Future. Basingstoke: Palgrave Macmillan, 365–389.
Horta, Oscar. 2015. "Speziesismus", in Ferrari, Arianna & Petrus, Klaus (eds.) Lexikon der Mensch/Tier-Beziehungen, Bielefeld: Transcript, 318–320.
Horta, Oscar. 2014. "The scope of the argument from species overlap". Journal of Applied Philosophy 31 (2): 142–54. .
Horta, Oscar. 2014. Una morale per tutti gli animali: al di là dell'ecologia, Milano: Mimesis, .
Horta, Oscar. 2013. "Zoopolis, Intervention and the State of Nature". Law, Ethics and Philosophy 1: 113–125. 
Horta, Oscar. 2010. "The Ethics of the Ecology of Fear against the Nonspeciesist Paradigm: A Shift in the Aims of Intervention in Nature". Between the Species 13 (10): 163–87. . 
Horta, Oscar. 2010. "Debunking the idylic view of natural processes: Population dynamics and suffering in the wild". Telos 17 (1): 73–88. 
Horta, Oscar. 2010. "What is speciesism?". Journal of Agricultural and Environmental Ethics 23 (3): 243–66. .

See also
 List of animal rights advocates

References

External links

 Ethics Beyond the Species - Oscar Horta's personal blog

Profiles
Oscar Horta at Academia.edu
Oscar Horta at Google Scholar
Oscar Horta at PhilPapers

Interviews
Interview with Christian Koeder
Interview with Animal Charity Evaluators
Interview with Knowing Animals
Interview with ARZone

1974 births
Living people
21st-century Spanish philosophers
Animal ethicists
Animal rights scholars
Animal welfare scholars
People associated with effective altruism
People from Vigo
Spanish animal rights activists
Spanish ethicists
University of Santiago de Compostela alumni
Academic staff of the University of Santiago de Compostela
Veganism activists
Organization founders